Lozen is a village in located in the Stolichna Municipality of Sofia City Province, Bulgaria.

References

Villages in Sofia City Province